Ruslan Taramov (born 13 July 1965) is a Russian boxer. He competed in the men's middleweight event at the 1988 Summer Olympics.

References

1965 births
Living people
Russian male boxers
Olympic boxers of the Soviet Union
Boxers at the 1988 Summer Olympics
Sportspeople from Grozny
Middleweight boxers